Interstate 220 (I-220) in Louisiana is an east–west bypass route around Shreveport, in the northwestern corner of the state. It runs  from I-20 and Louisiana Highway 3132 (LA 3132) in Shreveport to a second interchange with I-20 in Bossier City. The highway serve as a northern bypass of the downtown area for through traffic traveling on I-20, and, with LA 3132, the highway helps to carry through traffic between the two currently disconnected portions of I-49, the area's main north–south route.

Route description
I-220 begins at an interchange with I-20 and LA 3132 near Shreveport Regional Airport in western Shreveport. From here, the highway heads northeast toward and crosses Cross Lake. The highway continues northeast through northern Shreveport, where it has a currently partially opened interchange with I-49. At an interchange with U.S. Route 71 (US 71), the highway curves east before crossing the Red River near Shreveport Downtown Airport. East of the Red River, I-220 enters Bossier City and continues east through its northern areas before curving south at Shed Road. The highway ends at an interchange with I-20 at the southwest corner of the Louisiana Downs racetrack.

History
Together, I-220 and LA 3132 were both planned together as a full loop of Shreveport. However, because of Barksdale Air Force Base being in the way of the proposed route of the southeast quadrant, the two highways were both split into their respective designations and LA 3132 being truncated.

The first segment of I-220 was completed and signed in 1971, and the entire highway was completed in 1991.

Future
There have been proposals to extend the highway eastward over the Red River and then northward to complete the loop by reaching I-20, but Barksdale Air Force Base is in the way of a direct route to join up with the beginning of I-220. Aerial imagery shows ramp stubs for a possible extension southward from its eastern terminus with I-20. There is a connector road under construction that will connect to the Barksdale Air Force Base from I-220. It is scheduled for completion in late November 2022.

There are five options currently in contention for closing the gap in I-49 in Shreveport. Four of these options involve the construction of a new alignment extending from the existing I-49/I-20 interchange to the I-49/I-220 interchange currently under construction. This direct connection, known as the Inner City Connector, is controversial due to its path being projected through a residential neighborhood, which would necessitate the displacement of many of its residents. The fifth option involves routing through traffic via the existing LA 3132 and I-220 alignments after necessary improvements to those highways are carried out.

Exit list

References

External links

20-2 Louisiana
220
20-2
Transportation in Bossier Parish, Louisiana
Transportation in Caddo Parish, Louisiana
Transportation in Shreveport, Louisiana